Wenderson da Silva Costa Ferreira (born 7 June 1998), commonly known as Wenderson, is a Brazilian footballer who plays for Guarani as a midfielder.

Career statistics

Club

References

1998 births
Living people
Brazilian footballers
Association football midfielders
Botafogo de Futebol e Regatas players
C.D. Mafra players
Campeonato Brasileiro Série A players
Liga Portugal 2 players
Brazilian expatriate footballers
Expatriate footballers in Portugal
Brazilian expatriate sportspeople in Portugal
Footballers from Rio de Janeiro (city)